Apiotoma is a genus of sea snails, marine gastropod mollusks in the family Cochlespiridae.

Species
Species within the genus Apiotoma include:
 † Apiotoma balcombensis Powell, 1944. 
 † Apiotoma chapplei Powell, 1944. 
 † Apiotoma chapuisi Deshayes, 1865 . 
 † Apiotoma epimeces Cossmann. 1889 . 
 † Apiotoma epimeces aizyensis Cossmann, 1889
 † Apiotoma pirulata Deshayes, 1834
 † Apiotoma pirulata var. chedevillei Pezant, 1909
 † Apiotoma pirulata var. grignonensis Pezant, 1909
 † Apiotoma pritchardi Powell, 1944.
 Apiotoma tibiaformis Powell, 1969
 † Apiotoma zelandica Beu, 1970

References

 Cossmann, Maurice. Catalogue illustré des coquilles fossiles de l'eocène des environs de Paris. Vol. 4. 1889.
 Powell, 1944. Records of the Auckland Institute and Museum. 3 (1), p. 20.
 AW.B. Powell (1949), Biological Primary Types in the Auckland Museum: No. 3. Zoological (supplement); Records of the Auckland Institute and Museum Vol. 3, No. 6; pp. 403–409
 Maxime Glibert (1960) "Les Conadea fossiles du Cénozoïque étranger"; Koninklijk Belgisch Instituut voor Natuurwetenschappen; Verhandelingen, tweede reeks, deel 64
 Beu, Alan G. "Descriptions of new species and notes on taxonomy of New Zealand Mollusca." Royal Society of New Zealand, 1970.

External links